NF-kappa-B-activating protein is a protein that in humans is encoded by the NKAP gene.

References

Further reading